Petrolia  is a town in southwestern Ontario, Canada. It is part of Lambton County and is surrounded by Enniskillen Township. It is billed as "Canada's Victorian Oil Town" and is often credited with starting the oil industry in North America, a claim shared with the nearby town of Oil Springs.

Lambton Central Collegiate & Vocational Institute (LCCVI) is located in Petrolia.

History

In 1857 James Miller Williams of Hamilton began distilling some of the "tar" lying around Oil Springs (located a few kilometers south from Petrolia), after buying the property rights from Charles Nelson Tripp. In July or August 1858 he struck an oil deposit in Oil Springs while digging a shallow well, sparking the oil drilling industry. In 2008, the 150th anniversary of the discovery, Canada Post issued a stamp commemorating this first commercial oil well, featuring portraits of Charles Tripp and Williams.

Petrolia got its start in 1866 when a major gas well was found, resulting in an oil boom that caused many to abandon Oil Springs in favour of this new settlement. The place separated from Enniskillen Township and was incorporated as a town on 25 December of that same year.

Oil production went through several boom periods in Petrolia; one was in 1898 and another in 1938. Some wells sunk in 1938 were initially producing  at a price of $2 per barrel. This output, however, often lasted only a few weeks, falling to less than a barrel a day.

Oil men from Petrolia travelled to the far reaches of the world (Gobi Desert, Arctic, Iran, Indonesia, United States, Australia, Russia, and over 80 other countries) teaching others how to find and extract crude oil. Those born and raised in Petrolia are referred to as "Hard Oilers", paying tribute to the toughness of their ancestors. Petrolia is also home to the Petrolia Discovery museum. Some oil fields in the area are still operational.

Media and entertainment
Petrolia is home to Victoria Hall, a National Historic Site of Canada. Originally a fire hall, municipal office, police hall, jail and opera house, it was completed in 1889 for a total cost of $35 000. In January 1989, a fire caused extensive damage. It was subsequently restored, and re-opened in 1992. Currently it houses the town hall and Victoria Playhouse.

Directly adjacent to Victoria Hall is Petrolia's Victoria Park, which hosts the annual 'PizzaFest' food festival as a collaboration between the town and their 5 local pizza restaurants.

Until September 2013, The Petrolia Topic was the sole newspaper in the town of Petrolia. It is owned by Osprey Media. In September 2013, The Independent of Petrolia & Central Lambton began publication.

The Oil Heritage District Community Centre was opened in Petrolia in 2006. It serves rural and town residents in central Lambton County.

Climate

Demographics

Notable people
 Donald Ferguson Brown, a Canadian former politician, barrister and lawyer.
 Jedidiah Goodacre, film actor.
 Dale Hunter, a retired professional hockey player, and current OHL coach of the London Knights; former head coach of the Washington Capitals.
 Dave Hunter, a retired professional ice hockey player who won three Stanley Cups with the Edmonton Oilers in the 1980s
 Mark Hunter, a retired professional hockey player and currently co-owner (with brother Dale Hunter), and general manager of the London Knights OHL hockey team.
 Michael Leighton, former professional ice hockey goaltender who played for the Carolina Hurricanes, Philadelphia Flyers, Chicago Blackhawks and the Nashville Predators
 John Van Boxmeer, a retired professional ice hockey player with the Montreal Canadiens who then transitioned to coaching at the professional level in both the NHL and Europe.
 Peter Schiemann - one of the 4 Royal Canadian Mounted Police constables killed in the Mayerthorpe tragedy

See also
List of townships in Ontario
Petroleum industry

References

External links

Towns in Ontario
Lower-tier municipalities in Ontario
Municipalities in Lambton County
History of the petroleum industry in Ontario